Aurora City Hall is a historic city hall located at Aurora, Dearborn County, Indiana. It was built in two sections in 1870 and 1887.  The older section is a two-story, Italianate style brick and stone building purchased in 1882 to house the fire department.  The 1887 section was built to house the city hall and is a two-story, Romanesque Revival style brick and stone building with a gable front. The buildings were connected about 1970.

It was added to the National Register of Historic Places in 1996. It is located in the Downtown Aurora Historic District.

References

1870 establishments in Indiana
City and town halls on the National Register of Historic Places in Indiana
Italianate architecture in Indiana
Romanesque Revival architecture in Indiana
Government buildings completed in 1870
Buildings and structures in Dearborn County, Indiana
National Register of Historic Places in Dearborn County, Indiana
Historic district contributing properties in Indiana